1,3-Indandione (sometimes simply indanedione) is an organic compound with the molecular formula C6H4(CO)2CH2.  It is a β-diketone on an indane framework. It is a colorless or white solid although samples can appear yellowish or even green. It is a widely used building block

Structural properties
Solid 1,3-indandione is a diketone, As a solution in water, it is partially (~2%) enolized. The enolate anion exhibits significant delocalization, and the highest electron density is on the second carbon. This acid-base behavior explains many properties of the compound.

Preparation

1,3-Indandione can be prepared by decarboxylation of the sodium salt of 2-ethoxycarbonyl-1,3-indandione, which itself is obtained by Claisen condensation of ethyl acetate and dimethyl phthalate.

Chemical properties

The carbon at the C-2 position is alpha to both carbonyls, and thus can act as a nucleophile. It undergoes self-aldol condensation quite easily, resulting in bindone.

Bromination occurs at the 2-position:

One or both carbonyl groups can be reduced to alcohol groups or methylene groups, depending on the method used.

See also
 Vitamin K antagonist

References

External links

Indandiones